Spychowo  is a village in the administrative district of Gmina Świętajno, within Szczytno County, Warmian-Masurian Voivodeship, in northern Poland. The village has a population of 1,100.

History
In mid 13th century the Teutonic Order, following the medieval conquest of Old Prussia, built a fortification at the place of an Old Prussian settlement. 

The village was a favorite hunting post of the Prussian Kings and, after the Nazi rise to power, Hermann Göring. Before 1945 it was known as Puppen.

After World War II the village was initially renamed Pupy, which was changed to Spychowo in 1960. 

On September 23, 1979 the local Protestant church was charged whilst liturgy and forcefully taken over by Catholics.

Images

References

Spychowo